Athletics competitions have been held at the quadrennial South American Games since the inaugural edition of the Southern Cross Games in 1978 in La Paz, Bolivia.

Editions

Medals

Medal winners for the South American Games were published in a book by written Argentinian journalist Ernesto Rodríguez III with support of the Argentine Olympic Committee (Spanish: Comité Olímpico Argentino) under the auspices of the Ministry of Education (Spanish: Ministerio de Educación de la Nación) in collaboration with the Office of Sports (Spanish: Secretaría de Deporte de la Nación).  Eduardo Biscayart supplied the list of winners in athletics and their results.

See also
List of South American Games records in athletics

External links
Athletics gold medallists from 1978–2002 South American Games

References

 
South American Games
South American Games
Sports at the South American Games